Barrie Chase (born October 20, 1933) is an American actress and dancer.

Early life
Born in Kings Point, New York, Chase began formal dance lessons at age three, studying with the New York City Opera's ballet mistress. She studied ballet, first with Adolph Bolm and later with Maria Bekefi. She abandoned her intention to become a ballerina in New York to stay in Los Angeles and help support her mother, pianist Lee Keith, after her parents' divorce. She is the daughter of writer Borden Chase (Red River) and sister of screenwriter/actor Frank Chase.

Performing career
During the early 1950s, Chase danced on live television programs such as The Colgate Comedy Hour and The Chrysler Shower of Stars. While working as Jack Cole's assistant choreographer at Metro-Goldwyn-Mayer, she was asked by Fred Astaire to be his dancing partner on An Evening with Fred Astaire. She made four appearances as Astaire's partner in his television specials between 1958 and 1968. The two danced on Hollywood Palace in 1966. During this period, she dated Astaire, a widower.

She appeared on the syndicated talk show version of The Donald O'Connor Show. Chase worked in the chorus of many Hollywood musicals, including Hans Christian Andersen (1952), Call Me Madam (1953), Deep in My Heart (1954), Brigadoon (1954), Kismet (1955),  Pal Joey (1957), Les Girls (1957), and two Fred Astaire films, Daddy Long Legs (1955) and Silk Stockings (1957). She appeared in White Christmas (1954) as the chorus girl who speaks the line "Mutual, I'm sure."

Chase's other film roles included The George Raft Story (1961); the beating victim of a sadistic Robert Mitchum in the thriller Cape Fear (1962); and the dancing, bikini-clad paramour (restored footage revealed her character was in reality married) of Dick Shawn's dimwitted character in the 1963 comedy It's a Mad, Mad, Mad, Mad World. Subsequently, she played Farida in the film The Flight of the Phoenix (1965), starring James Stewart and Richard Attenborough, in a dream sequence. In 1965, she appeared in the episode "The Ballerina" on the TV series Bonanza, playing saloon dancer Kellie Conrad, who longed to be a ballerina. In 1967, she appeared as a Soviet ballerina in the episode "Fly, Ballerina, Fly" on the television series Mr. Terrific.

References

External links

Barrie Chase as Mystery Guest of "What's My Line?" (Feb 19, 1961)

Living people
20th-century American actresses
American female dancers
Dancers from New York (state)
Dancers from California
American film actresses
Actresses from Los Angeles
People from Kings Point, New York
21st-century American women
1933 births